Roger García Junyent  (born 15 December 1976), known simply as Roger, is a Spanish former footballer who played mostly as a left midfielder. He possessed a strong shot, and was known for his passing ability.

He spent most of his career at Barcelona, without much success, going on to represent three other teams until his retirement, including one abroad. When fit, he played an important part in Villarreal's La Liga consolidation.

Roger's career was significantly hampered by injuries, and he retired from football at the age of 30, amassing Spanish top-division totals of 247 matches and 28 goals.

Club career
Born in Sabadell, Barcelona, Catalonia, Roger was a product of local FC Barcelona's youth ranks. He made his debut for the first team in the 1994–95 season, going on to appear in 33 games the following campaign while scoring his first goal in a 1–1 away draw against Real Madrid, on 30 September 1995.

After two seasons where he appeared sparingly in back-to-back La Liga conquests, Roger moved to neighbouring RCD Espanyol also in the top division, where he was a starter for much of his stay. In his last year, he netted a career-best nine goals (third-best in the squad) while the side barely avoided relegation.

Roger then spent three seasons with Villarreal CF, playing only one match in his second year due to a serious injury. Over a 12-month period (2002–03, one with each club), he scored three goals while still in his own half of the field.

In 2006, Roger signed with Eredivisie giants AFC Ajax, joining former Barça teammate Gabri, but retired after just one season due to persistent injuries. At the Amsterdam Arena he became the last player to wear number 14, as it was subsequently retired in honor of club legend Johan Cruyff, his coach at Barcelona.

Roger had his first coaching experience in 2010–11, assisting former Barcelona teammate Lluís Carreras at CE Sabadell FC and attaining promotion to the second division. In November 2019, following a two-year spell with youth club CF Damm (he was also its sporting director), he was named assistant at RC Celta de Vigo where his older brother Óscar acted as manager.

Personal life
Roger's brothers, Óscar and Genís, were also footballers. All youth products of Barcelona, they had however different fates as professionals (especially the latter).

On 17 June 1997, during the final of the Copa Catalunya, all three appeared with the first team in a 3–1 loss to CE Europa.

Honours
Barcelona
La Liga: 1997–98, 1998–99
Copa del Rey: 1996–97, 1997–98
UEFA Cup Winners' Cup: 1996–97
UEFA Super Cup: 1997

Espanyol
Copa del Rey: 1999–2000

Villarreal
UEFA Intertoto Cup: 2004

Spain U21
UEFA European Under-21 Championship: 1998

References

External links

FC Barcelona profile

1976 births
Living people
Sportspeople from Sabadell
Spanish footballers
Footballers from Catalonia
Association football midfielders
La Liga players
Segunda División players
FC Barcelona Atlètic players
FC Barcelona players
RCD Espanyol footballers
Villarreal CF players
Eredivisie players
AFC Ajax players
Spain youth international footballers
Spain under-21 international footballers
Catalonia international footballers
Spanish expatriate footballers
Expatriate footballers in the Netherlands
Spanish expatriate sportspeople in the Netherlands